Dara Alizadeh (born 27 August 1993) is a Bermudian and American rower who represents Bermuda.

His father was Iranian and his mother arrived as a British youngster in Bermuda and the couple then met while studying at Tufts University in Massachusetts. He represented Bermuda at 2020 Summer Games, in the men's 1x.

He was the flagbearer for Bermuda at the opening ceremony of the Tokyo Games.

Reference

External links
 
 
 

Bermudian male rowers
Bermudian people of Iranian descent
Living people
1993 births
Rowers at the 2020 Summer Olympics
Olympic rowers of Bermuda
Penn Quakers rowers